The 2011 Radisson Blu Oslo Cup was held from September 22 to 25 at Snarøen Curling Club in Oslo, Norway as part of the 2011–12 World Curling Tour. The purses of the men's and women's events were 160,000 and 100,000 krona, respectively. The event was held in a round-robin format.

Men

Teams

Round Robin Standings

Tiebreakers

Qualifiers

Playoffs

Women

Teams

Round Robin Standings

Tiebreakers

Qualifiers

Playoffs

External links
Event Home Site 

2011 in curling